Ammunition is an EP by American rapper Chamillionaire. Ammunition is Chamillionaire's first major album release since his second studio album, Ultimate Victory (2007). With production handled by The Beat Bullies, and CyFyre, among others, and collaborated with artists such as Angel, Saigon and Marcus Manchild.

The album generally received positive reviews from music critics. In order to promote the album, Chamillionaire released a freestyle over Rick Ross's Stay Schemin' before the album's release.

Track listing

Sample credits
"All Mine" contains elements of "Hetki Lyö" as performed by Kirka.

References 

Chamillionaire albums
Chamillitary Entertainment albums
2012 debut EPs
Hip hop EPs
Southern hip hop EPs